Big Satan (also referred to as I Think They Liked It Honey) is a live album by saxophonist Tim Berne's Big Satan which was recorded in 1996 and released on the Winter & Winter label.

Reception
The AllMusic review by Glenn Astarita said "The band explores various methods of expounding upon a story line via Berne and Ducret's shredding lines and implosive mode of execution, while Rainey anchors the proceedings with loosely based polyrhythms and sweeping fills. Here, the musicians straddle the outside while also providing supplementary insight into familiar musical territories. (Strongly recommended.)"

Track listing
All compositions by Tim Berne except as indicated
 "Bobby Raconte une Histore" (Marc Ducret) - 11:36
 "Dialectes" (Ducret) - 15:24
 "The 12½% Solution" - 10:46
 "Scrap Metal" - 8:44
 "Yes, Dear" - 14:08
 "Description du Tunnel" (Ducret) - 16:19

Personnel
Tim Berne - alto saxophone, baritone saxophone
Marc Ducret - electric guitar
Tom Rainey - drums

References 

1997 live albums
Tim Berne live albums
Winter & Winter Records live albums